Oral Fixation Tour (known as Tour Fijación Oral in hispanophone countries) was the fourth concert tour by Colombian singer and songwriter, Shakira. It was launched in support of her sixth and seventh studio albums Fijación Oral, Vol. 1 (2005). and Oral Fixation, Vol. 2 (2005). It began on 14 June 2006 at the Feria De Muestras in Zaragoza, Spain. With assistance from the Creative Artists Agency, she visited twenty-seven cities and performed forty-one shows across five continents. The tour was additionally sponsored by Spanish automobile manufacturer SEAT, with whom Shakira also collaborated to support her Pies Descalzos Foundation. The tour concluded on 23 December 2007 in Tbilisi, Georgia.

It was the 15th highest-grossing concert tour of 2006 grossing over $58.6 million, although this figure only includes 41 shows in that year. The total tour grossed over $100 million in both years. It's her most extensive tour to date.

Background

The wardrobe Shakira wore on the concert was designed by Shakira and designer Roberto Cavalli. The stage was designed by Shakira and Spanish visual artist Jaume de Laiguana. She commented about the staging: "[It] will revolve around the art, dance and energy of rock and roll". On 3 February 2007, Shakira was scheduled to appear in the Netherlands. While a full stadium – 39,000 people – were waiting for Shakira, her official management announced that the show had to be rescheduled to March 17, 2007. Shakira was ill and had been advised to rest her voice. Shakira gave her manager the following letter to pass out to the crowd:
"I am very sad I cannot perform tonight. Holland is one of my favorite places on earth and I have been looking forward to doing this show for a long time. I promise I will make it up to you when I come back in March to give you the concert that the Dutch people deserve. Thanks for your understanding. All my love, Shakira".

Commercial reception
Shakira played in Mumbai, India, on 25 March 2007. Around 20,000 people attended the concert. It was one of the biggest concerts in India by an international artist.

During free show which took place on 27 May 2007 in Mexico City's Zócalo, 210,000 fans showed up to see her making it the biggest concert ever by a national and international artist in México. The previous record was held by Mexican rock group Café Tacuba.

She has broken many records during this tour. In Athens, she is the first female singer to have a show in Olympic Stadium, attracting over 40,000 people. In Timiosara, she is the only female singer to perform in Stadionul Dan Păltinișanu (with over 30,000 crowds) up till 2017. In Miami's American Airlines Arena, she holds the record of having the most shows (5 shows) in the venue as a female artist with a single tour. In Cairo, over 100,000 people joined Shakira at her concert in Giza Plateau. This sets the record of having the highest attendance in Egyptian concert history. In Mexico City's Palacio de los Deportes, she had 8 shows in the venue consecutively, holding the record of having the most shows in the venue as a female artist. She had a sold-out show in Guayaquil's Estadio Modelo Alberto Spencer Herrera with over 42,000 people, becoming the only one female singer playing a show there. In Santiago, her first show in Movistar Arena was quickly sold out and she later added a second show in the National Stadium which went completely sold out as well.

She played 15 shows in Spain, 10 shows in Germany and 21 shows in Mexico, which broke the record of having the most shows in these three countries as a Latin female artist.

Her shows in the entire U.S. and Canada leg from August 9 to September 26, 2006 were completely sold out. This includes shows in El Paso, Phoenix, Las Vegas, Los Angeles, San Diego, Anaheim, San Jose (2 shows), Denver, Chicago, Toronto, Washington D.C., Atlantic City (2 shows), Uncasville, Boston, New York City (2 shows), Atlanta, Orlando, Miami (2 shows), Houston, Corpus Christi, San Antonio, Dallas and Hildago (2 shows). Also the shows in Buenos Aires (2 shows), Dubai, Guayaquil, Istanbul, Madrid (2 shows), Mexico City (8 shows in Palacio de los Deportes), Miami (3 shows in December, 2006), Mumbai, Munich (2 shows), Lima, San Juan (3 shows) and Zurich (2 shows) were also completely sold out.

Broadcast and recordings

The shows in Miami, Florida and San Juan, Puerto Rico in December 2006 were filmed for a DVD release. Shakira had Alejandro Sanz as a guest and they performed together "La Tortura". Wyclef Jean was also a guest and performed "Hips Don't Lie" with Shakira. It was released under the title Oral Fixation Tour on 12 November 2007 worldwide. The audio was recorded and mixed in stereo and 5.1 by Gustavo Celis. The release was well received by critics, who commended Shakira's multi-instrumentalism. It was also well received commercially, peaking at number six on the US Top Music Videos chart,
and has been certified Platinum by the Recording Industry Association of America (RIAA). The album quickly shot up the Mexican charts, peaking at number one for two non-consecutive weeks, and remained in the top 10 for over eleven weeks. The concert was also screened in theaters across the United States.

Set list
The following set list is obtained from the August 9, 2006, concert in El Paso, Texas. It is not intended to represent all dates throughout the tour.

 "El Nay A'atini Nay" 
 "Estoy Aquí"
 "Te Dejo Madrid"
 "Don't Bother"
 "Antología"
 "Hey You" 
 "Inevitable" 
 "Si Te Vas"
 "Obtener Un Sí"
 "La Tortura"
 "No"
 "Whenever, Wherever"
 "La Pared"
 "Underneath Your Clothes"
 "Pies Descalzos, Sueños Blancos"
 "Ciega, Sordomuda"
 "Ojos Así"
 "Hips Don't Lie"

Shows

Box office score data

Notes

External links

Shakira concert tours
2006 concert tours
2007 concert tours